Çiğ köfte or chee kofta is a kofta dish that is a regional specialty of southeastern Anatolia in Edessa (modern-day Urfa). The dish is served as an appetizer or meze, and it is closely related with kibbeh nayyeh from Lebanese cuisine.

Çiğ köfte is common to Armenian and Turkish cuisines. 

Traditionally made with raw meat, there are vegetarian variations made with bulgur and in Urfa, a local meatless version is made with scrambled eggs.  In Diyarbakır province locally prepared batches are sold by street vendors.

Etymology
In Turkish, çiğ means "raw" and köfte means meatball. The word köfte derives from Persian, ultimately from the Proto-Indo-European root "*(s)kop–" (grind, pound, beaten).

In Aramaic, the indigenous language of Edessa, it is called ܐܰܟܺܝܢ (Acin).

Preparation
Bulgur is kneaded with chopped onions and water until it gets soft. Then tomato and pepper paste, spices and very fine ground beef or lamb are added. This absolutely fatless raw mincemeat is treated with spices while kneading the mixture, which is to cook the meat. Lastly, green onions, fresh mint and parsley are mixed in. Some çiğ köfte makers, particularly in Adıyaman, do not use water in their recipes. Instead of water, they use ice cubes and lemons.

Meat differences

In the beef variant, ground beef is used. Tendons and fat are removed before grinding the beef. High-quality beef is required, since it is served raw.

Since lamb is considered a "clean meat", it is often used for çiğ köfte instead of beef. Both Armenians and Turks use çiğ köfte as a meze, served almost cold. The raw meatball, or kofta, is not kept overnight and is reserved for special occasions. The lamb used must be deboned and trimmed of gristle and fat before it is prepared. The lamb is supposed to be butchered, bought, and prepared the very same day to ensure freshness.

With either meat, finely ground bulgur (durum and other wheat) is required. Other ingredients are mild onions, scallions, parsley, and usually green pepper.  Variants of the dish may use tomato sauce, Tabasco sauce, and mint leaves.  When served, it may be gathered into balls, or in one piece. Crackers or pita bread are sometimes used to consume ıt.

Regions

Turkey

The dish is often associated with Şanlıurfa province, where it is a popular street food, but it is a popular appetizer all over Turkey. The ingredients are all raw and traditionally include ground meat, bulgur, tomato paste, fresh onion, garlic and other spices for flavoring such as "isot" and black pepper. A favorite way of eating çiğ köfte is rolled in a lettuce leaf, accompanied by good quantities of ayran to counter-act the burning sensation that this very spicy food will give.

A vegetarian version of ciğ köfte may also be made with only bulgur grains. The preparation is similar to the versions that include meat, and some cooks also add pomegranate molasses. Depending on the cook's preferences, spices like cumin may be used instead of isot in the preparation of vegetarian versions. Another vegetarian variation from Urfa is made with scrambled eggs.

Although the traditional recipe requires minced raw meat, the version in Turkey consumed as fast-food (through small franchise shops in every neighborhood of Turkey) must be meatless by law due to hygienic necessities. Therefore, çiğ köfte is, unless specifically made, vegan in Turkey. Meat is replaced by ground walnuts, hazelnuts and potato.

Armenia 
Chi kofte is considered a delicacy in Cilician Armenian culture and is normally prepared on special occasions, especially during holidays. There are many varieties of chi kofte among Armenian families depending on the historic region they are from and their personal preferences. For example, some may use more or less bulgur, and some may use more or less pepper paste depending on their desired spiciness.

Traditional Armenian chi kofte is made in two varieties, either in loose meatball form in the shape of a small egg, or flattened on a plate with olive oil and minced green onions, similar to kibbeh nayyeh. However, unlike Levantine Arabs, eating chi kofte with bread is not common among Armenians.
 
A vegetarian variety also exists which is shaped very similarly to chi kofte and with a similar texture. Although it is prepared throughout the year, it is particularly popular during Lent in accordance with the diet restrictions of the Armenian Apostolic Church.

United States 
Chi kofte was introduced in the United States by Armenian immigrants, and is commonly referred to as Armenian beef tartare.

Legend about its origins

King Nemrut, the king of an ancient civilization in the Adıyaman region, decides to burn Abraham because he believes in one god. With the order he gave to his people, he gathered all the wood and wood pieces in the kingdom in a big square. There was no wood left for cooking in the houses, and fires were forbidden. The wood and pieces of wood gathered in the square are the only fire to be lit to burn Ibrahim. The people gathered pieces of wood in the square for days by order of the king. 

A hunter, who is unaware of this order because he is hunting on the mountain, brings the deer he has hunted to his house and asks his wife to cook it. She tells about the co-king's prohibition to light a fire. The hunter also obeys the desperate order. The hunter separates the right hind leg of the deer and crushes it with a fine stone. Add the bulgur, black pepper and salt and knead it well with the ground beef. It is rumored that raw meatballs were first made by this hunter and his family.

See also

 Kısır
 List of meatball dishes
 List of meat dishes

References

External links
Lamb çiğ köfte recipe

Raw beef dishes
Kofta
Lamb dishes
Meze
Bulgur dishes
Armenian cuisine
Lenten foods
Vegan cuisine
Turkish cuisine
Kurdish cuisine
Şanlıurfa Province
Jewish cuisine